Vladimir Flórez also known as Vladdo (born 1963 in Armenia, Quindío) is a Colombian cartoonist and political satirist. His work is published in the Colombian weekly magazine Revista Semana and has received numerous journalistic awards including 3 National Journalistic Awards (Premio Nacional de Periodismo) and an Excellency Award (Premio de Excelencia) by the Inter American Press Association in the "Cartoon" category.

Aleida 

He created his feminine character called Aleida in 1997. She is a harsh interpretation of the feminine behaviour who criticizes men and uses cynicism to make fun of herself. Her frames have many followers not only in Colombia but also in other Latin American countries as well as in the whole world.
Vladdo runs the monthly satire newspaper "Un Pasquín", which is delivered for free.

Works 
Vladdo has written three books of caricature and politics.

Mis Memorias, 1989
Vladdografías, 1996 
Lo mejor de lo peor, 2002

External links
 Vladdo official website
 Vladdo in Revista Semana

1963 births
Living people
People from Quindío Department
Colombian cartoonists
People from Armenia, Colombia